Disappear may refer to:
 "To disappear" someone (transitive verb), referring to forced disappearance.

Music
 Disappear (album), or the title song, by T.S.O.L., 2001
 "Disappear" (Hoobastank song), 2005
 "Disappear" (INXS song), 1990
 "Disappear" (Motion City Soundtrack song), 2009
 "Disappear" (No Angels song), 2008
 "Disappear", by 8stops7 from Birth of a Cynic
 "Disappear", by Beyoncé from I Am... Sasha Fierce
 "Disappear", by Bullet for My Valentine from Scream Aim Fire
 "Disappear", by Dream Theater from Six Degrees of Inner Turbulence
 "Disappear", by Evanescence from Evanescence
 "Disappear", by Greenwheel from Soma Holiday
 "Disappear", by the Haunted from Unseen
 "Disappear", by Jars of Clay from The Eleventh Hour
 "Disappear", by Letters to Cleo from Go!
 "Disappear", by Madness from Absolutely
 "Disappear", by Mazzy Star from Among My Swan
 "Disappear", by A Perfect Murder from Cease to Suffer
 "Disappear", by R.E.M. from Reveal
 "Disappear", by Screaming Jets from The Screaming Jets
 "Disappear", by the Sound of Arrows from Voyage
 "Disappear", by Starset from Horizons
 "Disappear", by Sunny Day Real Estate from The Rising Tide
 "Disappear", by Tonight Alive from Underworld
"Disappear", from the 2015 stage musical Dear Evan Hansen

See also
 Disappearance (disambiguation)
 Disappeared (disambiguation)
 Disappearing (disambiguation)
 "Disappearer", a song by Sonic Youth from Goo
 "I Disappear", a song by Metallica